Okara may refer to:
 Okara (food), soy pulp in East Asian cuisines
 Okara, Pakistan, a city in Pakistan
 Okara District, the highest-level administrative division with the name
 Okara Tehsil, a lower-level administrative division
 Okara railway station
 Okara Cantonment, adjacent to Okara city
 Okara Park, a sports stadium in New Zealand
 Gabriel Okara (1921–2019), Nigerian writer

See also
 Okarvi
 Ocara, a municipality in Brazil